Loxura is a genus of butterflies in the family Lycaenidae. The species in this genus are found in the Indomalayan realm.

Species
The genus includes the following species:
Loxura atymnus (Stoll, [1780]) - yamfly
Loxura cassiopeia Distant, 1884

References

External links
 Loxura, at EOL.
 Loxura, at NCBI.

 
Lycaenidae genera
Taxa named by Thomas Horsfield